La Honda (Spanish for "The Sling") is a census-designated place (CDP) in southern San Mateo County, California, United States. The population was 979 at the 2020 census. It is located in the Santa Cruz Mountains between the Santa Clara Valley and the Pacific coast of California. La Honda is near the La Honda Creek Open Space Preserve and State Route 84 on the ocean side of the Coastal Range. 

The ZIP Code for La Honda is 94020 and the area code is 650. Land-line numbers in the La Honda telephone exchange follow the pattern 747-xxxx while wired telephones in and around the Middleton Tract (along Portola State Park Road) work out of the Los Altos exchange with 94x-xxxx numbers. Per the U.S. Geological Survey, Lahonda is a historic variant of the modern spelling.

Geography
According to the United States Census Bureau, the CDP covers an area of 4.3 square miles (11.0 km), 99.65% of it land, and 0.35% of it water.

Habitat
La Honda is home to diverse habitats, from cool, moist forests of coast redwood and coast Douglas fir, to mixed woodland, chaparral, and grassy hillsides.

Climate

This region experiences warm (but not hot) and dry summers, with no average monthly temperatures above .  According to the Köppen Climate Classification system, La Honda has a warm-summer Mediterranean climate, abbreviated "Csb" on climate maps. In addition, like much of California, the town receives most of its rain between November and April. Due to El Niño, the region sometimes receives extra winter rains, making it vulnerable to landslides. Scenic Drive, a local road, has seen three landslides since 1998. With elevations ranging from about 300 feet where La Honda Creek meets Alpine Creek, to more than 1200 feet in the hills, the weather may vary between the town's hillsides and valleys. Sometimes the marine layer is too low to reach the hills, leaving the lower elevations foggy or overcast while the mountains enjoy clearer weather. On some winter nights, similar thermal inversions trap cold air in the valleys, leading to frost, with higher elevations remaining generally milder. These same weather patterns are at play in much of the coast-facing Santa Cruz Mountains.

Demographics

The 2010 United States Census reported that La Honda had a population of 928. The racial makeup of La Honda was 811 (87.4%) White, 13 (1.4%) African American, 0 (0.0%) Native American, 16 (1.7%) Asian, 2 (0.2%) Pacific Islander, 18 (1.9%) from other races, and 68 (7.3%) from two or more races. Hispanic or Latino of any race were 69 persons (7.4%).

The Census reported that 916 people (98.7% of the population) lived in households, 0 (0%) lived in non-institutionalized group quarters, and 12 (1.3%) were institutionalized.

There were 411 households, out of which 98 (23.8%) had children under the age of 18 living in them, 203 (49.4%) were opposite-sex married couples living together, 31 (7.5%) had a female householder with no husband present, 16 (3.9%) had a male householder with no wife present.  There were 40 (9.7%) unmarried opposite-sex partnerships, and 10 (2.4%) same-sex married couples or partnerships. 101 households (24.6%) were made up of individuals, and 16 (3.9%) had someone living alone who was 65 years of age or older. The average household size was 2.23.  There were 250 families (60.8% of all households); the average family size was 2.64.

The chronological age of residents was spread out, with 153 people (16.5%) under the age of 18; 50 people (5.4%) aged 18 to 24; 202 people (21.8%) aged 25 to 44; 442 people (47.6%) aged 45 to 64; and 81 people (8.7%) who were 65 years of age or older. The median age was 47.6 years. For every 100 females, there were 113.8 males. For every 100 females age 18 and over, there were 107.8 males.

The homeowner vacancy rate was 2.3%; the rental vacancy rate was 3.3%. A reported 689 people (74.2% of the population) lived in owner-occupied housing units, and 227 people (24.5%) lived in rental housing units.

Early history 

The Ohlone lived in San Mateo County for at least 3,000 years prior to European arrival and had more than 40 communities in the region. The La Honda Ohlone were hunter gatherers and lived without farming or herd animals.

The creek that runs through the town is listed as Arroyo Ondo on several diseños on the Mexican land grants and as Arroyo Hondo on the 1856 Rancho Cañada de Raymundo map.  Hondo is Spanish for 'deep'. The post office was listed as La Honda in 1880 and revised to Lahonda after 1895.  The name was restored in 1905 owing to Z. S. Eldredge's efforts.

In 1862 John Howell Sears purchased 400 acres and settled in La Honda after his prior residence in Searsville was sold to the water company due to the decline of lumber and flooding issues. The early days of La Honda were built around the lumber industry and the Old Store at La Honda was one of the earliest buildings.

Recent history 
Ken Kesey, the author of One Flew Over the Cuckoo's Nest (pages of which were written all over the restroom wall of his La Honda residence) and other books, owned a home in La Honda, which served as the base of operations for The Merry Pranksters where they used LSD and other drugs. The escapades of Kesey and the Merry Pranksters are documented in Tom Wolfe's The Electric Kool-Aid Acid Test, which describes the wildly painted school bus, 'Furthur', driven by Neal Cassady, who had been the hyperkinetic driver in Jack Kerouac's On the Road.

The La Honda house where Kesey's adventures became famous—one mile (1.6 km) west of Apple Jack's Inn—has been faithfully restored after years of neglect and a near-catastrophic flood in 1998.

Schools
The town has a single school, La Honda Elementary, located within the La Honda-Pescadero Unified School District.

Festivals
The town hosts the La Honda Fair & Music Festival every June, and holds an annual Fourth of July picnic at Play Bowl.

Notable residents
 Joe Cottonwood
 Richard Allen Davis
 Ken Kesey
 Paul Vixie
 Neil Young
 Pegi Young
 Hunter S. Thompson
 Allen Ginsberg 
 The Merry Pranksters
 Hells Angels
 Brian Sagrafena
 Jim Warren (computer specialist)

See also
 Middleton Tract
 Skeggs Point

References

External links

 Sam McDonald county park – reference includes biography of a very interesting man more details
 Pescadero creek park
 Memorial park
 PDF Oil field map of La Honda area, (see Inset B).
 The Cottage at Where Water Falls
 La Honda Fair & Music Festival – official Facebook page
 La Honda Elementary School

Census-designated places in San Mateo County, California
Census-designated places in California